The 2013–14 UCLA Bruins women's basketball team represented the University of California, Los Angeles during the 2013–14 NCAA Division I women's basketball season. The Bruins, led by third year head coach Cori Close, play their home games at the Pauley Pavilion and were a members of the Pac-12 Conference. With many injuries, the team finished the season in 8th place on a conference record of 7–11 and 13–18 overall, and the graduation of seniors Thea Lemberger and Atonye Nyingifa.

Roster

Schedule

|-
!colspan=9| Regular Season

|-
!colspan=9 | 2014 Pac-12 Conference women's tournament

Source

Honors
All-Pac-12

Nirra Fields, G, So., Montreal, Canada
Atonye Nyingifa, F, Sr., Torrance, Calif.

Honorable Mention
 
Corinne Costa, (F/C, RSJr.)

Pac-12 All-Academic Team

Honorable Mention: Thea Lemberger and Atonye Nyingifa

See also
2013–14 UCLA Bruins men's basketball team

References

UCLA
UCLA Bruins women's basketball